Farnésio Dutra e Silva (14 November 1921 – 4 August 1987), better known as Dick Farney, was a Brazilian (jazz) pianist, pop-composer, and "crooner" popular in Brazil from the late 1940s to the mid 1970s and 1980s.

He began playing piano as a child as his father taught him classical music and his mother taught him how to sing. In 1937, he debuted as a singer on the show "Hora Juvenil" of Radio Cruzeiro do Sul in Rio de Janeiro, performing the song Deep Purple composed by Pete DeRose. Dick was taken by César Ladeira to Radio Mayrink Veiga to host the program "Dick Farney, the Voice and Piano". He then formed the group "Os Swing Maniacos" alongside his brother Cyll Farney on drums. The band accompanied Edu da Gaita for the recording of "Indian Song" by Nikolai Rimsky-Korsakov. From 1941 to 1944, he was a crooner with the orchestra of Carlos Machado at the Casino da Urca when gambling was still allowed in Brazil.

In 1946 he was invited to the United States after meeting the arranger Bill Hitchcock and pianist Eddy Duchin at the Copacabana Palace Hotel. In 1947 and 1948 he appeared on many radio shows of NBC, particularly as a regular singer at Milton Berle Show. In 1948 he performed at Vogue, a nightclub in Rio de Janeiro. In 1959 he had his own TV program, the Dick Farney Show, which was aired by TV Record - Channel 7 in São Paulo. In 1960 he formed the band Dick Farney and His Orchestra and played at many events. In 1965 he had the Dick and Betty Show on the newly created TV Globo - Channel 4, Rio de Janeiro, presented by himself and Betty Faria.

He was the owner of the nightclubs "Farney's" and "Farney's Inn", both in São Paulo. He also formed a trio with Sabá in 1971. From 1973 to 1978, he played piano and sang at the nightclub "Chez Régine" in Rio.

Discography 
1944 - The Music Stopped (fox)/Mairzy doats (fox-trot) - with the Ferreira Filho Orchestra - Gravadora Continental
1944 - What's new? (fox-trot) - crooner do conjunto Milionários.
1944 - San Fernando Valley/I love you
1944 - I don't want to walk without you
1945 -  This love of mine/The man I love
1946 -  Copacabana/Barqueiro do rio São Francisco - with Eduardo Patané
1946 -  Era ela/Ela foi embora
1947 -  Worth Duckin' (parody of the Duckworth Chant, on A side of V-Disc 799, with Leroy "Slam" Stewart on bass and scat-singing)
1947 -  Just an Old Love of Min (Peggy Lee/Dave Barbour)/For Once in My Life (Fisher/Segal) with Paul Baron and his Orchestra
1947 -  Marina/Foi e não voltou
1947 -  Gail in Galico/For sentimental reasons
1948 -  Ser ou não ser/Um cantinho e você
1948 -  Meu Rio de Janeiro/A saudade mata a gente
1948 -  Esquece/Somos dois…
1949 -  Ponto final/Olhos tentadores
1949 -  Junto de mim/Sempre teu
1950 -  Não tem solução/Lembrança do passado - gravadora Sinter
1951 -  Uma loira/Meu erro
1951 -  Canção do vaqueiro/Nick Bar
1952 -  Mundo distante/Não sei a razão
1952 -  Luar sobre a Guanabara/Fim de romance
1952 -  Sem esse céu/Alguém como tu
1953 -  Perdido de amor/Meu sonho
1953 -  Nova ilusão/João Sebastião Bach
1953 -  April in Paris/All the things you are
1953 -  Speak low/You keep coming back like a song
1954 -  Copacabana/My melancholy baby
1954 -  Tenderly/How soon - Majestic Records
1954 -  Somebody loves me/There's no sweeter word than sweetheart
1954 -  Marina/For once in your life
1954 -  Grande verdade/Você se lembra?
1954 -  Outra vez/Canção do mar
1954 -  Tereza da praia/Casinha pequenina - with Lúcio Alves
1954 -  Música romântica com Dick Farney-
1954 -  Sinfonia do Rio de Janeiro
1955 -  A saudade mata a gente
1955 -  Foi você/Tudo isto é amor
1955 -  Dick Farney e seu Quinteto
1955 -  Bem querer/Sem amor nada se tem
1955 -  Dick Farney on Broadway
1956 -  Jingle bells/White Christmas/Feliz Natal
1956 -  Jazz Festival
1956 -  Jazz after midnight
1956 -  Meia-noite em Copacabana com Dick Farney
1956 -  Dick Farney Trio
1957 -  Un argentino en Brasil/Nem fala meu nome
1957 -  O ranchinho e você/Só eu sei
1957 -  Toada de amor/O luar e eu…
1959 -  Este seu olhar/Se é por falta de adeus
1959 -  Esquecendo você/Amor sem adeus
1959 -  Atendendo a pedidos
1960 -  Dick Farney em canções para a noite de meu bem
1960 -  Dick Farney e seu jazz moderno no auditório de O Globo
1960 -  Dick Farney no Waldorf
1961 -  Somos dois/Uma loura
1961 -  Dick Farney Jazz
1961 -  Dick Farney Show
1961 -  Jam Session
1962 -  Dick Farney apresenta sua orquestra no auditório de O Globo - featuring Leny Andrade
1965 -  Meia-noite em Copacabana
1967 -  Dick Farney, piano e Orquestra Gaya
1972 -  Penumbra e romance
1973 -  Dick Farney
1973 -  Concerto de Jazz ao vivo
1974 -  Dick Farney e você
1974 -  Um piano ao cair da tarde
1975 -  Um piano ao cair da tarde II
1976 -  Dick Farney
1976 -  Tudo isso é amor - with Claudette Soares
1977 -  Cinco anos de jazz
1978 -  Dick Farney
1978 -  Tudo isso é amor II
1979 -  Dick Farney: o cantor, o pianista, o diretor de orquestra - série Retrospecto - gravadora RGE
1981 -  Noite
1983 -  Feliz de amor
1985 -  Momentos
1987 -  Dick Farney "ao vivo" (Arte do espetáculo)

References

External links
http://www.allmusic.com/artist/dick-farney-mn0000254561/biography
http://www.last.fm/music/Dick+Farney/+wiki

1921 births
1987 deaths
Brazilian pianists
20th-century Brazilian male singers
20th-century Brazilian singers
Musicians from Rio de Janeiro (city)
20th-century Brazilian pianists
Male pianists